Nur Mustafa Gülen (born July 26, 1960) is a Turkish football coach and former footballer. Currently he is the head coach of the Turkey women's national football team.

Career
Born in Istanbul on July 26, 1960, Gülen studied physical education and sports at Marmara University, graduating in 1985.

He played football in Turkish amateur and professional leagues. He was member of Beşiktaş (1980–1981), Sarıyerspor (1982–1983), Sakaryaspor (1986–1987) and Çaykur Rizespor (1987–1989) playing in the Süper Lig..

In 1996, he went to Italy and joined a technical director training program in Rome. He was appointed head coach of the Italian second-league women's team Lazio (women) in 1999. After one season, he returned home, and became assistant coach to Nevio Scala at Beşiktaş (2000–2001). Gülen served as assistant to Ziya Doğan at Kombassan Konyaspor (2001) and at Malatyaspor (2001–2002). Later, he was Feyyaz Uçar's assistant at Karşıyaka S.K. (2003–2004), at Malatyaspor (2004–2006) and again at Karşıyaka S.K. (2005–2006). Following a season as assistant to Walter Zenga at Gaziantepspor (2006–2007), Gülen became head coach serving at TFF Third League team Yeni Burdur Gençlikspor (2007–2008). Nur Mustafa Gülen was appointed coach to Turkey women's national team, serving as assistant and head coach at senior, U19, U17, and U15 teams.

References

External links
Personal website

1960 births
Footballers from Istanbul
Marmara University alumni
Turkish footballers
Süper Lig players
Beşiktaş J.K. footballers
Sakaryaspor footballers
Çaykur Rizespor footballers
Turkish football managers
Turkish expatriate sportspeople in Italy
Expatriate football managers in Italy
Konyaspor managers
Malatyaspor managers
Gaziantepspor managers
Turkey women's national football team managers
Living people
Association footballers not categorized by position